Ross Albert Grimsley Sr.  (June 4, 1922 – February 6, 1994) was a Major League Baseball pitcher who appeared in 7 games for the Chicago White Sox in . He threw left-handed.

Grimsley was signed by the St. Louis Cardinals before the  season and then drafted by the Brooklyn Dodgers in the  minor league draft. Late in the 1951 season, his contract was purchased by the White Sox, where he made his only major league appearances during September of that season.

His son, also named Ross Grimsley, had an 11-year major league career.

References

External links

1922 births
1994 deaths
Baseball players from Kansas
Birmingham Barons players
Chanute (minor league baseball) players
Charleston Senators players
Chicago White Sox players
Columbus Cardinals players
Fort Worth Cats players
Houston Buffaloes players
Knoxville Smokies players
Licoreros de Pampero players
Louisville Colonels (minor league) players
Major League Baseball pitchers
Memphis Chickasaws players
Montreal Royals players
Nashville Vols players
Omaha Cardinals players
People from Americus, Kansas
Topeka Owls players
Toronto Maple Leafs (International League) players
Winston-Salem Cardinals players